is the name of a Japanese advice column featured in the Yomiuri Shimbun. The title roughly translates as "A guide for life". It is also translated and run in The Japan News, the English language edition of the Yomiuri, as Troubleshooter.

Origins 
It was originally inspired by a similar column in the French newspaper Le Figaro, and featured in the "Fujin Furoku" (Women's supplement) page of the paper. The column was called "Mi No Ue Sodan", or "Personal Discussions." In 1942 amid war shortages the column was discontinued. It was restarted in 1949.

Representative mentors 
 Junko Umihara
 Masami Oh'hinata
 Kazuki Ōmori
 Keiko Ochiai
 Youko Saisyoh
 Machiko Satonaka
 Kiyoshi Shigematsu
 Jakucho Setouchi
 Hidenemi Takahashi
 Wahei Tatematsu
 Tatsurou Dekune
 Sachiyo Toi
 Shouichirou Nomura
 Megumi Hisada
 Masahiko Fujiwara
 Akemi Masuda
 Taku Mayumura

References 

Advice columns